Smisor Stadium is a sport stadium in Sterling, Kansas.  The facility is primarily used by Sterling College for college football.  The stadium is also used for local high school and other community events.

References

External links
 Sterling College official website

American football venues in Kansas
Buildings and structures in Rice County, Kansas
Sterling College (Kansas)